Cung oán ngâm khúc (chữ Hán: 宮怨吟曲 Complaint of a Palace Maid) is a Vietnamese poem by Nguyễn Gia Thiều (1741–98) originally composed in nôm script.

The English title has also been rendered as the "Lament of a Royal Concubine" or "The Complaints of the Royal Harem." The poem is an example of song thất lục bát ("double seven, six eight") form of  poetry in the ngâm "lament" style.

Text

References

Vietnamese poems